True Files (also known as Shanghai Lilly) is a 2002 film directed by John D. Lamond and starring Sam Bottoms, Lim Kay Tong, Leah Di Stasio, and Glory Annen. Set in 1936, its plot concerns an American woman whose husband is shot while he is in bed with a prostitute.

The film was shot in 1997 in a backlot in Singapore.  The film languished in legal limbo for a time after one of the financiers suffered a stroke but Lamond managed to sell it to 10 territories, mostly in Asia.

References

External links

Singaporean thriller films
Hong Kong thriller films
2002 films
2000s English-language films
2000s Hong Kong films